Wauna is a census-designated place in Pierce County, Washington, United States with a 2010 census population of 4,186.

History 
Originally platted as Springfield on September 14, 1889, Wauna's name was changed at the government's request, because of the many Springfields in Washington. Wauna, a Native American term for mighty water, was chosen as the new name by an early post mistress, Mary Frances White.

Bibliography
Students of Goodman Middle School, Along the Waterfront, Clinton-Hull Printing Company LTD, Copyright applied for 1979, 85-88

Census-designated places in Pierce County, Washington
Unincorporated communities in Washington (state)
Census-designated places in Washington (state)